Carlos Leon may refer to:

 Carlos Leon (athlete), American Paralympic shot putter
 Carlos Augusto León (1914–1997), Venezuelan poet, essayist, politician and scientist
 Carlos De León (born 1959), Puerto Rican boxer
 Carlos Leon, former partner of Madonna